The Daughters of Mars is a 2012 novel by Australian novelist Tom Keneally.

Plot summary

Sally and Naomi Durance are two nurses from country New South Wales who are shipped to Egypt during World War I end up on the Red Cross hospital ship Archimedes, stationed in the Dardanelles. The novel follows the sisters through that campaign and on to northern Europe.

Notes

 Dedication:
To the two nurses,
Judith and Jane

Reviews
 The Guardian
 The Sydney Morning Herald
 The Telegraph

Awards and nominations

 2012 winner Colin Roderick Award 
 2013 longlisted Miles Franklin Literary Award 
 2013 shortlisted New South Wales Premier's Literary Awards — Christina Stead Prize for Fiction 
 2013 shortlisted Australian Book Industry Awards (ABIA) — Australian Literary Fiction Book of the Year 
 2014 longlisted International Dublin Literary Award

References 

2012 Australian novels
Novels by Thomas Keneally
Vintage Books books
Novels set in Egypt